The Church of St. Denis  is a parish church in Liège, Belgium. The fortified building was designed to be part of the city's defences. It was founded by Notker of Liège in 987 and first consecrated on 12 March 990. The tower was added around 1100.

History
The Church of St Denis originally had the status of collegiate church. It was one of the seven collegiate churches of Liège, which until the Liège Revolution of 1789 collectively comprised the "secondary clergy" in the First Estate of the Prince-bishopric of Liège. 
The church was suppressed in 1797, but the building was taken into use as a parish church in 1803.

The church has since 1936 been included on a heritage register, and is currently listed as "exceptional heritage" of Wallonia.

References

990 establishments
10th-century churches
10th-century establishments in Belgium
Former collegiate churches in Belgium
Fortified church buildings
Mosan art
Romanesque architecture in Belgium
Saint-Denis
Towers completed in the 11th century
Ottonian architecture
Wallonia's Major Heritage